Leonardo "Leo" Gabriel Suárez (born on 30 March 1996) is an Argentine professional footballer who plays as a winger for Liga MX club América.

Club career

Boca Juniors
Born in General San Martín Partido, Suárez joined Boca Juniors' youth setup in 2002, aged six, after starting it out at lowly Villa Esperanza. He made his first team debut on 9 November 2014, coming on as a second half substitute for Federico Carrizo in a 2–0 home win against Club Atlético Tigre for the Primera División championship.

Villarreal
On 10 December 2014 Suárez moved to Villarreal CF, after agreeing to a -year deal for a €2million fee. He was assigned to the reserves in Segunda División B.

Suárez made his La Liga debut on 17 December 2016 as an 88th-minute substitute for Alexandre Pato in a 3–1 victory over Sporting de Gijón.

Valladolid (loan)
On 19 August 2018, Suárez was loaned to fellow top division side Real Valladolid, for one year. He recently scored the winner in a 1-0 victory over his parent club in La Liga.

Mallorca (loan)
In January 2019, Suárez was loaned to RCD Mallorca until the end of the season.

Club America
On 12 January 2020 Suárez signed for Liga MX side Club America ending his five year spell in Europe.

International career
A regular name in Argentina's youth squads, Suárez was called up by under-20s for the 2015 South American Youth Football Championship, held in Uruguay. He made his debut in the competition on 18 January, coming on as a second-half substitute for Ángel Correa in a 6–2 routing over Peru; he also scored the fifth and assisted Giovanni Simeone in the sixth.

Four days later, Suárez started in a 3–0 win against Bolivia, and provided the assist in all of the three goals. He finished the tournament with three appearances and four assists, as his side were crowned champions.

Honours
Argentina U20
 South American Youth Football Championship: 2015

References

External links

1996 births
Living people
People from General San Martín Partido
Argentine footballers
Association football wingers
Argentine Primera División players
Boca Juniors footballers
La Liga players
Segunda División players
Segunda División B players
Liga MX players
Villarreal CF B players
Villarreal CF players
Real Valladolid players
RCD Mallorca players
Club América footballers
Argentina youth international footballers
Argentina under-20 international footballers
2015 South American Youth Football Championship players
Argentine expatriate footballers
Argentine expatriate sportspeople in Spain
Expatriate footballers in Spain
Expatriate footballers in Mexico
Sportspeople from Buenos Aires Province